Sypolt is a surname of German origin. It has its origins in the state of Bavaria and has the Americanized spelling of the German surnames; Seibold, Seipolt and Seipold.

List of people with the surname 

 David Sypolt (born 1964), American politician
 Diane Gilbert Sypolt (born 1947), American judge
 Terri Funk Sypolt (born 1953), American politician

References

See also 

 Polt

Surnames
Americanized surnames
Surnames of German origin
German-language surnames